Below is list of Swedish language exonyms for places in non-Swedish-speaking areas of the world. Not included are spelling changes and translations of non-proper nouns.

In general
Diacritical marks (such as ´ ` ^ etc above letters) are generally stripped, except that Å, Ä, Ö, are kept, and usually also Ü and É (but È and Á are written E and A).
Norwegian, Danish, Icelandic and Faroese Æ and Ø are often written as AE or Ä and Ö, especially in the press.

Foreign place names containing a direction such as South or Upper are often translated, e.g.:
East Timor – Östtimor
Northern Ireland – Nordirland
South Africa - Sydafrika
but U.S. states nowadays keep their English names in Sweden:
e.g. South Carolina and West Virginia

Albania

Argentina

Austria

Belgium

Bulgaria

China

Croatia

Cuba

Czechia

Denmark

Newspapers in Sweden usually write all æ as ä or ae and all ø as ö, because of the lack of æ and ø on the Windows keyboard layout for Swedish, and historically because of the lack of them on Swedish typewriters. Swedish newspapers normally write aa as å. Aa is the traditional spelling of the "aw" sound in Danish, but this spelling does not exist for this sound in Swedish. Both spellings of the sound exist in Danish, aa in some names, but å always being correct.

Swedish Wikipedia writes Danish place names using the original æ and ø, except for those listed above.

Egypt

Estonia

Estonia had a significant indigenous Swedish-speaking population until the mid-20th Century, so many of these names are not really exonyms in the strict sense of the word.

Finland 
Swedish is one of the two official languages of Finland, so the Swedish names of places in Finland are not exonyms.

France

Germany

Greece

Hungary

Iceland

Iraq

Israel

Italy

Latvia

Lebanon

Lithuania

Mali

Morocco

Netherlands

Norway
The (more or less, requires some knowledge of certain words) mutually intelligible Norwegian and Swedish languages have different spelling systems for the same sounds.

Newspapers in Sweden usually write all æ as ä or ae and all ø as ö, because of the lack of æ and ø on the Windows keyboard layout for Swedish, and historically because of the lack of them on Swedish typewriters. Apart from æ and ø, the Norwegian spelling is used in Sweden.

Examples include Askøy, Bodø, Bærum, Galdhøpiggen, Gjøvik, Hønefoss, Røros, Stjørdal, Tønsberg, Tromsø, Vadsø and Østfold, which are usually by media written as Asköy, Bodö, Bärum or Baerum, Galdhöpiggen, Gjövik, Hönefoss, Röros, Stjördal, Tönsberg, Tromsö, Vadsö and Östfold.

The Norwegian spelling with æ and ø is still often used. Swedish Wikipedia writes Norwegian place names using the original æ and ø.

Palestine

Poland

Portugal

Romania

Russia

Some of these names are not really exonyms in the strict sense of the word, as the places have been part of Sweden, some founded as such.

Saudi Arabia

Slovakia

South Africa

Spain

Switzerland

Syria

Turkey

Ukraine

United Kingdom

Some historic area names beginning with British are translated, such as British Guyana into "Brittiska Guyana". British Columbia in Canada is nowadays kept.

United States

See also

List of European exonyms
Names of European cities in different languages

Swedish language
Lists of exonyms